The YbhL leader is a putative structured RNA element that is found upstream of the uncharacterized YbhL membrane protein in alpha-proteobacteria.

Other non-coding RNAs uncovered in the same analysis include: speF, suhB, metA and serC.

References

External links
 

Cis-regulatory RNA elements